Howard Lake is a lake in Wright County, in the U.S. state of Minnesota.

Howard Lake was named for John Howard (prison reformer) (1726–1790), an English prison reformer of the 18th century.

See also
List of lakes in Minnesota

References

Lakes of Minnesota
Lakes of Wright County, Minnesota